Sir Robert George Throckmorton, 8th Baronet (5 December 1800 – 28 June 1862) was an English Whig and Liberal politician who sat in the House of Commons from 1831 to 1835.

Throckmorton was the son of William Throckmorton and his wife Frances Gifford, daughter of Thomas Gifford, 22nd of Chillington. The Throckmortons were a prominent  Roman Catholic family, who continued to hear mass at the family home Coughton Court, Alcester, Warwickshire. In 1826 the family estate at Molland in Devon devolved to Throckmorton when his uncle succeeded to the baronetcy. The Roman Catholic Relief Act 1829 allowed Catholics to hold national office for the first time in almost three hundred years.

Throckmorton took advantage of the change in the law to become one of the first Catholic MPs after Daniel O'Connell achieved the feat in 1828 and eventually had Catholic Emancipation signed into law. At the 1831 general election he was elected MP  for Berkshire, the location of his third country estate, Buckland Park (though it is now in Oxfordshire). He held the seat until 1835.  He also became a JP and Deputy Lieutenant for Berkshire. He was High Sheriff of Berkshire in 1843.

Throckmorton inherited the baronetcy in 1840 on the death of his uncle Sir Charles Throckmorton, 7th Baronet. He built a new Catholic church at the end of the south drive of Coughton Court, next to  the ruins of the church built by an earlier Throckmorton in the 15th century which was confiscated from the family during the Reformation.

Throckmorton  died at the age of 61.

Throckmorton married Elizabeth Acton, daughter of Sir John Acton, 6th Baronet of Aldenham on 16 July 1829.

References

External links

1800 births
1862 deaths
UK MPs 1832–1835
UK MPs 1831–1832
Members of the Parliament of the United Kingdom for Berkshire
Deputy Lieutenants of Berkshire
Throckmorton, 8th Baronet
High Sheriffs of Berkshire
People from Warwickshire
People from Buckland, Oxfordshire
Robert
Whig (British political party) MPs for English constituencies